Joseph Paul Anthony Selmersheim, known as Tony Selmersheim (2 June 1871 – 16 August 1971) was a French architect and decorator.

Life
Joseph Paul Anthony Selmersheim was born on 2 June 1871 in Saint-Germain-en-Laye, Yvelines.
His parents were Antoine Paul Selmersheim, an architect, and Madeleine (or Marie) Victorine Louise Eugénie Naples.
His brother was Pierre Selmersheim.
He became an architect, and worked with Charles Plumet.
Selmersheim worked at La Maison Moderne of Julius Meier-Graefe, whose showrooms displayed rooms decorated in Art Nouveau style, with designers such as Henry van de Velde, Victor Horta, Charles Plumet and Maurice Dufrêne.

By the start of the 20th century the partnership of Selmersheim and Plumet had become the leading Art Nouveau company in Paris. 
They tried to combine British and Belgian design innovations with French taste. The results could be graceful.
However, the buildings they made were not particularly innovative apart from the addition of curvilinear ornamentation, which was unusual at the time.
Frantz Jourdain wrote a positive article on Selmersheim in 1904. He noted that Selmersheim felt an architect should also be a designer. 
He discussed a complete room that Selmersheim had designed, including the structure, decoration and furniture, which succeeded by relieving the inhabitant of the need to concern himself with making his home habitable.

Gustave Soulier considered Plumet and Selmersheim were truly innovative in their furniture designs, which combined workmanship, elegance and functionality.
Selmersheim became a member of L'Art dans Tout, a group of decorative artists.
Tony Selmersheim died on 16 August 1971 in Ussy-sur-Marne, Seine-et-Marne.

Publications

Notes

Sources

1871 births
1971 deaths
People from Saint-Germain-en-Laye
20th-century French architects
École des Beaux-Arts alumni
French centenarians
Men centenarians